Scottsville is a city in Harrison County, Texas, United States. The population was 376 at the 2010 census, up from 263 at the 2000 census. Scottsville's population in 2020 decreased to 334.

History
The area was initially settled by William Thomas Scott, his wife Mary Rose, and other members of their families in June 1840. He quickly acquired several large parcels of land, established five cotton plantations, including Scottsville Plantation, his residence, constructed by slaves. Scott's lavish plantation was said to be identical to Jefferson Davis' mansion in Mississippi, and he eventually became the largest slave owner in Harrison County.

On August 4, 1869, Scottsville was granted a post office. The community had an estimated population of 300 in 1929. In 1936, a historical marker was erected in Scottsville to commemorate both the founding of the community and the centennial of Texas Independence. During the Great Depression, the population fell to a low of 50, but had recovered to 260 by the 1950s. The number of inhabitants remained steady throughout the latter half of the twentieth century in contrast to Uncertain, Texas.

Geography

Scottsville is located at  (32.536098, –94.241611), along Farm Roads 1998 and 2199, north of U.S. Highway 80 in east-central Harrison County. US 80, which forms the southern border of Scottsville, leads west into Marshall and east  to Waskom.

Climate

The climate in this area is characterized by hot, humid summers and generally mild to cool winters. According to the Köppen Climate Classification system, Scottsville has a humid subtropical climate, abbreviated "Cfa" on climate maps.

Demographics

In 2010 Scottsville had a population of 376. The racial composition of the population was 44.4% white, 46.3% black or African American, 1.3% Native American, 1.6% Vietnamese, 0.3% other Asian, 2.7% from some other race and 3.5% from two or more races. 7.2% of the population was Hispanic or Latino of any race. Per the American Community Survey's 2018 estimates, the population grew to 389. Of the population, 44.0% of the populace were non-Hispanic white, 49.1% Black or African American, and 1.3% from two or more races. Hispanics or Latinos of any race made up 5.7% of the population; by 2020, its population decreased to 334.

According to the census of 2000, there were 263 people, 91 households, and 66 families residing in the city. The population density was 200.5 people per square mile (77.5/km). There were 99 housing units at an average density of 75.5 per square mile (29.2/km). The racial makeup of the city was 42.97% White, 54.75% African American, 0.38% from other races, and 1.90% from two or more races. Hispanic or Latino of any race were 1.52% of the population.

There were 91 households, out of which 41.8% had children under the age of 18 living with them, 45.1% were married couples living together, 24.2% had a female householder with no husband present, and 26.4% were non-families. 24.2% of all households were made up of individuals, and 13.2% had someone living alone who was 65 years of age or older. The average household size was 2.89 and the average family size was 3.39.

In the city, the population was spread out, with 33.5% under the age of 18, 6.1% from 18 to 24, 27.8% from 25 to 44, 22.4% from 45 to 64, and 10.3% who were 65 years of age or older. The median age was 33 years. For every 100 females, there were 77.7 males. For every 100 females age 18 and over, there were 65.1 males.

The median income for a household in the city was $31,000, and the median income for a family was $30,250. Males had a median income of $30,625 versus $18,750 for females. The per capita income for the city was $16,225. About 19.7% of families and 21.0% of the population were below the poverty line, including 32.7% of those under the age of eighteen and 7.7% of those 65 or over.

Education

Public education in the city of Scottsville is provided by the Marshall Independent School District. Zoned campuses include David Crockett Elementary School (grades K–5), Sam Houston Elementary School (grades K-5),Price T. Young (grades K-5), Marshall Junior High School (grades 6–8), and Marshall High School (grades 9–12).

References

Cities in Harrison County, Texas
Cities in Texas
Populated places established in 1840